Elizabeth Scott, Duchess of Buccleuch may refer to:

 Elizabeth Scott, Duchess of Buccleuch (1743–1827), the wife of Henry Scott, 3rd Duke of Buccleuch, Duchess from 1767 until 1812
 Elizabeth Scott, Duchess of Buccleuch (born 1954), the present Duchess of Buccleuch and Queensberry, wife of Richard Scott, 10th Duke of Buccleuch